Mahmut Temür (born 8 October 1989) is a Turkish footballer who plays for Mittelrheinliga club SV Eintracht Hohkeppel.

Career
He made his debut in the German 3. Liga for SSV Jahn Regensburg on 24 July 2010 in a match against SV Werder Bremen II.

References

External links 
 
 

1989 births
German people of Turkish descent
Footballers from Cologne
Living people
Turkish footballers
Turkey youth international footballers
Association football midfielders
1. FC Köln II players
SSV Jahn Regensburg players
FC Rot-Weiß Erfurt players
FC 08 Homburg players
Mersin İdman Yurdu footballers
Gaziantep F.K. footballers
Adanaspor footballers
Karşıyaka S.K. footballers
Alemannia Aachen players
Oberliga (football) players
Regionalliga players
3. Liga players
TFF First League players
TFF Second League players